Scouting for Girls is the eponymous debut album by London-based indie pop group Scouting For Girls. It was released on 17 September 2007 and has been certified 3 times platinum in the United Kingdom since its release. It contains the hit singles "She's So Lovely" and "Elvis Ain't Dead" as well as their song "It's Not About You", which was only released as a limited-copy EP in June 2007. The album had a two-week run as the UK Album Chart 'Number 1 album' on 20 January 2008 after taking over from Amy Macdonald's debut album This Is The Life. It was replaced on 3 February 2008 by Adele's debut album 19.

Singles
"It's Not About You" was released as the first single on 25 June 2007. It peaked at #17 on the UK Singles Chart.
"She's So Lovely" was released as the second single on 27 August 2007. It peaked at #7 on the UK Singles Chart as the most successful single on the album.
"Elvis Ain't Dead" was released as the third single on 17 December 2007. It peaked at #8 on the UK Singles Chart.
"Heartbeat" was released as the fourth single on 7 April 2008. It peaked at #10 on the UK Singles Chart.
"I Wish I Was James Bond" was released as the fifth single on 7 November 2008. It peaked at #21 on the UK Singles Chart.
"Keep on Walking" was originally set for release as the fifth single, yet instead it was released as a promotional single on 9 March 2009. It peaked at #78 on the UK Singles Chart.

Track listing

Bonus tracks

Chart performance
When it was first released in September 2007, Scouting for Girls debuted at No.12. The next week it fell down 8 places and then fell out of the top 40 in October 2007. It started to climb back up the chart in January 2008 until it reached its new peak of No.4 on 13 January. The next week it climbed to No.1 after 18 weeks of falling and climbing then it remained there for two weeks.

On 28 December 2008, it was announced as the 10th biggest selling album of 2008 after 60 weeks on the chart. The album has sold 952,303 copies as of October 2015.

Charts

Weekly charts

Year-end charts

Certifications

Personnel
Performance credits

 Vocals: Greg Churchouse, Peter Ellard, Roy Stride
 Guitar: Greg Churchouse, Roy Stride
 Bass: Greg Churchouse
 Percussion: Peter Ellard

 Piano: Roy Stride
 Castanets: Randy Blong
 Horn: Martin Owen
 Trumpet: James McMillan
 Whistling: Otis Spooge

Technical credits

 Engineering: Julian Wilmott, Andy Green
 Production: Andy Green
 Programming: Andy Green

 Mixing: Andy Green
 Mastering: Ted Jenson

References

2007 debut albums
Scouting for Girls albums